Cheilosia pubera is a Palearctic hoverfly.

Description
External images For terms see Morphology of Diptera
Body 7.0 mm. to 8.0.mm. long. The finely punctured mesonotum is clothed with uniformly long golden brown hairs and the abdomen with uniformly yellowish brown hairs. The wingbases are yellowish brown.

Distribution
Fennoscandia, Ardennes, North Spain and the Alps; from Ireland East through northern
and central Europe. Mountains of northern Italy and Yugoslavia into European
Russia.

Habitat
Forest wetland, montane pasture and fen carr and beside streams in Fagus and Picea forest.

Biology
Low flying and settling on the foliage of large-leaved
plants. Flowers visited include Acer platanoides, Caltha, Cardamine, Prunus padus, Pulsatilla alpina, Ranunculus and Taraxacum. Flies from the end of April to June at lower altitudes, and June to July at higher altitudes and more northerly latitudes.

References

Diptera of Europe
Eristalinae
Insects described in 1838